The 1929 Appalachian State Mountaineers football team represented Appalachian State Teachers College—now known as Appalachian State University—in the 1929 college football season. The team was led by first-year head coach C. B. Johnston and played their home games at College Field in Boone, North Carolina.

Schedule

References

Appalachian State
Appalachian State Mountaineers football seasons
Appalachian State Mountaineers football